Aporobopyrus is a genus of Isopoda parasites, in the family Bopyridae, that contains the following 20 species:

Aporobopyrus aduliticus Nobili, 1906
Aporobopyrus bonairensis Markham, 1988
Aporobopyrus bourdonis Markham, 2008
Aporobopyrus calypso Bourdon, 1976
Aporobopyrus collardi Adkison, 1988
Aporobopyrus curtatus Richardson, 1904
Aporobopyrus dollfusi Bourdon, 1976
Aporobopyrus enosteoidis Markham, 1982
Aporobopyrus galleonus Williams & Madad, 2010
Aporobopyrus gracilis Nierstrasz & Brender à Brandis, 1929
Aporobopyrus megacephalon Nierstrasz & Brender à Brandis, 1929
Aporobopyrus muguensis Shiino, 1964
Aporobopyrus orientalis Shiino, 1933
Aporobopyrus oviformis Shiino, 1934
Aporobopyrus parvulus Bourdon, 1983
Aporobopyrus parvus Shiino, 1939
Aporobopyrus pleopodatus Bourdon, 1983
Aporobopyrus retrorsa Richardson, 1910
Aporobopyrus ryukyuensis Shiino, 1939
Aporobopyrus trilobatus Nierstrasz & Brender à Brandis, 1925

References 

Isopod genera
Parasites
Cymothoida